Rabiʽ al-Thani (also known as Rabi' al-Akhirah, Rabi al-Akhir, or Rabi' II is the fourth month of the Islamic calendar. The name Rabī‘ al-Thani means "the second spring" in Arabic, referring to its position in the pre-Islamic Arabian calendar.

In the days of the Ottoman Empire, the name of this month in Ottoman Turkish was Rèbi' ul-aher, with the Turkish abbreviation Rè, or Reb.-ul-Akh. in western European languages. In modern Turkish, it is Rebiülahir or Rebiülsani.

Meaning
The word "Rabi" means "spring" and Al-thani means "the second" in the Arabic language, so "Rabi' al-Thani" means "the second spring" in Arabic. As the Islamic calendar is a purely lunar calendar, the month naturally rotates over solar years, so Rabīʽ al-Thani can fall in spring or any other season. Therefore, the month cannot be related to the actual season of spring.

Timing
The Islamic calendar is a purely lunar calendar, and months begin when the first crescent of a new moon is sighted. Since the Islamic lunar year is 11 to 12 days shorter than the tropical year, Rabī' al-Thānī migrates throughout the seasons. The estimated start and end dates for Rabī' al-Thānī are as follows (based on the Umm al-Qura calendar of Saudi Arabia):

Islamic events
 08 or 10 Rabī' al-Thānī, the birth of the Eleventh Imam Hasan al-Askari
 10 or 12 Rabī’ al-Thānī, death of Fatimah bint Musa
 11 of Rabī’ al-Thānī, death of Abdul-Qadir Gilani, the Sufi sheikh who is believed to be the "saint of saints"
15 of Rabi' al-Thani, death of Habib Abu Bakr al-Haddad
27 of Rabi' al-Thani, death of Ahmad Sirhindi
 28 or 29 of Rabī’ al-Thānī, death of ibn Arabi, the great philosopher from Spain who died and rests in Damascus, Syria.

References

External links
Islamic-Western Calendar Converter (Based on the Arithmetical or Tabular Calendar)

4
Islamic terminology